The College of Engineering (CoE) is one of the three undergraduate colleges at the University of California, Santa Barbara.

As of 2021, there were approximately 150 faculty, 1,650 undergraduate students, and 750 graduate students. According to the  Leiden Ranking, engineering and physical sciences at UCSB is ranked #1 among public universities for top 10% research citation impact. According to the National Research Council rankings, the UCSB engineering graduate research program in Materials was ranked #1 and Chemical Engineering ranked #5 in the nation among public universities.

Departments and programs
The College of Engineering comprises the following departments:
 Chemical Engineering (established in 1965)
 Computer Science (established in 1979)
 Electrical and Computer Engineering (established in 1962) 
 Materials (established in 1987)
 Mechanical Engineering (established in 1964)
 Technology Management (established in 2022)

The college is connected to the UCSB campus through innovative multi-disciplinary/outreach academic programs:
 Biological Engineering Program (BioE)
 Computational Science and Engineering Program (CSE)
 Media Arts and Technology Program (MAT)

Research units
One of the strengths of the College of Engineering is its ability to cross traditional academic boundaries in collaborative research. Much of this work is conducted in collaboration with UCSB's interdisciplinary research centers and institutes, which include:
 American Institute for Manufacturing Integrated Photonics (AIM Photonics) in collaboration with SUNY Polytechnic Institute.
 California NanoSystems Institute
 Center for Bio-Image Informatics
 Center for Control, Dynamical-Systems, and Computation
 Center for Information Technology and Society
 Center for Nanotechnology in Society
 Center for Stem Cell Biology and Engineering
 Complex Fluid Design Consortium
 Dow Materials Institute
 Institute for Collaborative Biotechnologies
 Institute for Multiscale Materials Studies
 Institute for Energy Efficiency
 Interdisciplinary Center for Wide Band-Gap Semiconductors
 Materials Research Laboratory
 Mitsubishi Chemical Center for Advanced Materials
 National Nanofabrication Infrastructure Network
 Optoelectronics Research Group
 Solid State Lighting and Energy Electronics Center
 UCSB Nanofabrication Research Center

Academics

Undergraduate programs

The college offers the B.S. degree in chemical engineering, computer engineering, computer science, electrical engineering, and mechanical engineering. The B.S. programs in chemical engineering, electrical engineering, and mechanical engineering are accredited by the Engineering Accreditation Commission of Accreditation Board for Engineering and Technology (ABET). The computer science B.S. program is accredited by the Computing Accreditation Commission of ABET.

Jointly with the Department of Computer Science and the Department of Electrical and Computer Engineering, the college offers undergraduate degree in computer engineering.

The curriculum for the undergraduate programs is designed to be completed in four years.

Graduate programs
The college offers M.S. and Ph.D. degrees in chemical engineering, computer science, electrical & computer engineering, materials science, and mechanical engineering. It also offers graduate programs in technology management, bioengineering, biomolecular science & engineering, and media arts & technology.

Faculty
The college has 150 faculty members, most of whom are involved in interdisciplinary research and academic programs. Twenty-nine faculty members are in the National Academy of Engineering and nine are elected to the National Academy of Sciences. Three faculty members have won the Nobel Prize. Alan J. Heeger, Professor of Physics and of Materials, won the 2000 Nobel Prize in Chemistry "for the discovery and development of conductive polymers", Herbert Kroemer, Professor of Electrical and Computer Engineering and of Materials, won the 2000 Nobel Prize in Physics "for developing semiconductor heterostructures used in high-speed and opto-electronics". In 2006 Shuji Nakamura, a professor of Materials and Computer Engineering, won the Millennium Technology Prize for developing blue, green, and white LEDs and the blue laser diode as well as receiving a 2014 Nobel Prize in Physics for his contribution to the invention of blue light-emitting diodes. In 2015, Professor Arthur Gossard was awarded the National Medal of Technology and Innovation by the Obama Administration.

Publications
Convergence is the magazine of Engineering and the Sciences at UC Santa Barbara. Sponsored by the College of Engineering and the Division of Mathematical, Life, and Physical Sciences in the College of Letters and Science, Convergence was begun in early 2005 as a three-times-a-year print publication, with the goal of bringing stories of interest from engineering and the sciences to the desks and coffee tables of a wide range of alumni, friends, partners, funding agencies, corporations, donors and potential supporters. This publication prints annually.

See also
 University of California, Santa Barbara
 Engineering colleges in California

References

External links
UCSB College of Engineering
Department of Chemical Engineering
Department of Computer Science  
Department of Electrical & Computer Engineering 
Department of Materials  
Department of Mechanical Engineering 
Computer Engineering Program

College of Engineering
Engineering universities and colleges in California
Educational institutions established in 1964
University subdivisions in California
1964 establishments in California